Edmond Paul Philion (born March 27, 1970) is the former defensive line coach of the Saskatchewan Roughriders.  A former Canadian Football League defensive tackle who played eight seasons for the Montreal Alouettes, he won the 90th Grey Cup in 2002 and was an East Division All-Star from 2003 through 2006.  Philion was a hockey player for the Essex 73's Jr.C. team in the mid-1980s.

Philion was the defensive line coach for the Toronto Argonauts in 2013, and then for the Edmonton Eskimos from 2014 to 2015.  He became the DL coach of the Edmonton Eskimos in January 2014.

References

1970 births
Living people
Buffalo Bills players
Canadian football defensive linemen
Canadian Football League announcers
Canadian players of American football
Edmonton Elks coaches
Ferris State Bulldogs football players
Montreal Alouettes players
Players of Canadian football from Ontario
Rhein Fire players
Sportspeople from Windsor, Ontario
Gridiron football people from Ontario